The Jenkins Octagon House is an historic octagon house located on NY 395 in Duanesburg, Schenectady County, New York. It was built about 1855 by noted master carpenter Alexander Delos "Boss" Jones.  It is a two-story, clapboard-sided farmhouse with Greek Revival style features. It features innovative stacked plank construction, a low-pitched polygonal roof with a central chimney, a full entablature circling the structure, and a one-story porch with a hipped roof.  Also on the property are two contributing barns, a shed, and a gazebo.

The property was covered in a 1984 study of Duanesburg historical resources.
The property was also covered in a study of Boss Jones TR

It was listed on the National Register of Historic Places in 1984.

References

Houses on the National Register of Historic Places in New York (state)
Greek Revival houses in New York (state)
Houses completed in 1855
Octagon houses in New York (state)
Houses in Schenectady County, New York
National Register of Historic Places in Schenectady County, New York